Sharp Memorial Hospital is a hospital in San Diego, California, in the United States. Opened in 1955, Sharp Memorial is Sharp HealthCare's largest hospital and the system's only designated Level II trauma center. Located in Serra Mesa, the hospital has 656 beds, including 48 for intensive-care services.

In January 2009, the new expansion of Sharp Memorial Hospital opened.
beds.

Hospital features
The Stephen Birch Healthcare Center at Sharp Memorial Hospital features operating suites and intensive-care beds.

The operating suites use boom technology to suspend equipment from the ceiling. The ceiling-mounted equipment gives the surgeons and surgical staff more mobility during procedures and also improved infection control. Surgical equipment for the operating suites includes the da Vinci Surgical System to perform robotic, minimally invasive surgery. A new feature of the hospital is that every room is a private room with its own bathroom, at no extra cost to the patient, and with sleeping space for a family member or loved one to stay the night.

The hospital has a larger Emergency and Trauma Center with 37 emergency treatment bays and 10 emergency observation beds and a new surgery center with 10 surgery suites. The new center is nearly 300 percent larger than that in the original building. The center now has 52 beds, including 4 trauma beds. The center also includes a cardiac and stroke center, a 64-view CT scanner to provide the most advanced CT scans, two radiological suites dedicated for X-rays taken directly in the Emergency and Trauma Center, an area to perform lab tests in the center for quickest results and more.

A garden is located off the main lobby. Family lounges are located on each floor of the hospital.

Maternity and neonatal care is provided next door at Sharp Mary Birch Hospital for Women & Newborns.

Medical firsts
Sharp Memorial Hospital has pioneered many medical firsts. Some of these include:

• First hospital in California recognized by the Centers for Medicare and Medicaid as a Destination Center for mechanical assist device
• The first hospital in San Diego to offer an employee-assistance program for all employees
• First implantation of a miniature defibrillator to protect against sudden cardiac death
• First major long-term rehabilitation center
• First to offer Novalis-Shaped Beam Surgery device, a cancer treatment that applies high doses of radiation to small areas of the brain
• First to use mechanical Jarvik-7 heart
• First to use the da Vinci Robotic Surgical System
• First use of the Left Ventricular Assist Device (LVAD)
• Sharp Memorial Hospital, along with the San Diego Cardiac Center, participates in the first-ever gene transfer therapy clinical trial in patients with heart failure
• Sharp Memorial Hospital's transplant team performs the first live donor kidney transplants using laparoscopic technique
• The first private employer-sponsored child care center, cosponsored by Sharp Memorial Hospital

Services
• Cancer Services
• Emergency Services and Trauma Center
• Heart and Vascular Services
• Orthopedics
• Outpatient Services
• Palliative Care Services
• Pre-Anesthesia Evaluation Services
• Rehabilitation Services
• Robotic-Assisted Surgery
• Senior Services
• Stroke Center
• Thoracic (Lung) Surgery
• Transplant (Kidney, Pancreas, and Heart)
• Weight-Loss (Bariatric) Surgery
• Wound and Ostomy Inpatient Center
• Onlay spinal fusion center of excellence

Awards
In 2012, Sharp Memorial was formally designated as a Planetree Designated Patient-Centered Hospital, which recognized Sharp Memorial's achievement and innovation in the delivery of patient-centered care. Sharp Coronado Hospital is the only other hospital in California to receive the designation.

In 2010, Press Ganey Associates, Inc., recognized Sharp Memorial Hospital with its Press Ganey Top Improver Award for continuous improvement in patient satisfaction scores.

In 2010, Sharp Memorial Hospital received the Gold Medal of Honor from the Department of Health and Human Services for its Organ Transplantation Program.

Three Sharp Memorial caregivers were honored with the 2010 Spirit of Planetree Award, recognizing their personal embodiment of the hospital's patient-centered approach to providing care.

In June 2010, Sharp Memorial was named "The Most Beautiful Hospital in America" by Soliant Health.

In January 2008, Sharp Memorial became the second Sharp hospital to receive the American Nurses Credentialing Center Magnet recognition for nursing excellence, making Sharp HealthCare the first health system in California with two Magnet-designated hospitals.

References

External links
 Official site of Sharp HealthCare
 Official site of Sharp Memorial Hospital
This hospital in the CA Healthcare Atlas A project by OSHPD

Hospital buildings completed in 1955
Hospitals in San Diego
Hospitals established in 1955
1955 establishments in California
Hospital buildings completed in 2009
Trauma centers